Lệnh Công or Duke Lệnh may refer to:

Kiều Thuận ( 10th century), warlord during the Period of the Twelve Warlords who called himself Kiều Lệnh Công
Nguyễn Thủ Tiệp (908–967), warlord during the Period of the Twelve Warlords who called himself Nguyễn Lệnh Công